The 2007 season was Club de Regatas Vasco da Gama's 109th year in existence, the club's 92st season in existence of football, and the club's 39th season playing in the Brasileirão Série A, the top flight of Brazilian football.

Players

Squad information 

As of 31 December 2007

Transfers

In

from Youth system

Out

Competitions

Brasileirão Série A

Copa do Brasil

Rio de Janeiro State Championship

Copa Sudamericana

Squad appearances and goals 
Last updated on 2 December 2007.

|-
! colspan=14 style=background:#dcdcdc; text-align:center|Goalkeepers

|-
! colspan=14 style=background:#dcdcdc; text-align:center|Defenders

|-
! colspan=14 style=background:#dcdcdc; text-align:center|Midfielders

|-
! colspan=14 style=background:#dcdcdc; text-align:center|Forwards

|}
Notes

See also 
 2007 Brasileirão Série A
 2007 Copa do Brasil
 2007 Copa Sudamericana

References

External links
Official Site 

CR Vasco da Gama
Club de Regatas Vasco da Gama seasons
Vasco da Gama